Junik is a town located in Junik Municipality in the Gjakova District in western Kosovo. According to the 2011 census, the town of Junik has 6,053 inhabitants, while the municipality has 6,084 inhabitants. Based on the population estimates from the Kosovo Agency of Statistics in 2016, the municipality has 6,425 inhabitants.

It is located between Deçan and Gjakova along Kosovo's mountainous border with Albania. It is populated with ethnic Albanians. Junik is the hometown of several prominent people including former heavyweight European boxing champion Luan Krasniqi, Robin Krasniqi and poet Din Mehmeti.

History
During the Ottoman occupation of the Balkans, Junik and the Municipality of Junik were part of the Nahiya of Altun-ili during the 15th century. In a 1485 defter of the region, Junik was mentioned with the name Lunik. In the 15th century, around half of Junik's population had typical Albanian anthroponomy. During the early period of Ottoman occupation, Gjakova and the Gjakova Municipality were part of the Nahiya of Altun-ili. Most of the villages in the Nahiya of Altun-ili were dominated by inhabitants with Albanian anthroponomy, which indicates that during the 15th century (as supported by Ottoman defters), the lands between Junik and Gjakova were inhabited by a dominant ethnic Albanian majority.

Notable people 
 Luan Krasniqi
 Robin Krasniqi
 Din Mehmeti
 Ali Jasiqi, a writer

See also 
 District of Gjakova
 Neutral Zone of Junik

Notes

References

External links 

Populated places in Kosovo
Cities in Kosovo